Braxton Kelley (born October 24, 1986) is a former American football linebacker. He was signed by the Denver Broncos as an undrafted free agent in 2009. He played college football at Kentucky.

External links
Denver Broncos bio

1986 births
Living people
Players of American football from Georgia (U.S. state)
American football linebackers
Kentucky Wildcats football players
Denver Broncos players
People from LaGrange, Georgia